Huaycama may refer to:
 Huaycama, Ambato, Catamarca, Argentina
 Huaycama, Valle Viejo, Catamarca, Argentina